Bibi Hayat (also Romanized as Bībī Ḩayāt and Bībī Haiāt) is a village in Kavirat Rural District, Chatrud District, Kerman County, Kerman Province, Iran. At the 2006 census, its population was 228, in 58 families.

References 

Populated places in Kerman County